Áureo Lídio Moreira Ribeiro (born 17 February 1979) often simply known as Áureo is a Brazilian politician and a businessman. Born in Rio de Janeiro, he has served as a state representative since 2015.

Personal life
Áureo is married to Aline and has two children: Gabriel and Alice. He is a member of the Methodist Church.

Political career
Áureo has been the head of the Solidariedade party in the Brazilian chamber of deputies since September 2017.

Áureo  voted in favor of the impeachment against then-president Dilma Rousseff. Áureo opposed the Brazil labor reform (2017), and would later also vote in favor of a corruption investigation into Rousseff's successor Michel Temer and a similar impeachment motion.

References

1979 births
Living people
People from Duque de Caxias, Rio de Janeiro
Solidariedade politicians
Brazilian Methodists
Brazilian businesspeople
Members of the Chamber of Deputies (Brazil) from Rio de Janeiro (state)